Philippe Dominique Toledo (born 18 December 1983) is a French former professional footballer who played as a striker.

Career
Born in Avignon, Toledo played youth football with Nîmes. Not yet aged 18, he moved to Spain where he would remain the following decade, in representation of Zaragoza B, Elche, Levante B, Cartagena, Valencia Mestalla, Real Jaén, Ceuta, Gandía, and Guadalajara; he went on to amass Segunda División and Segunda División B totals of 356 games and 94 goals, notably scoring five times for Zaragoza's reserves in a 7–3 away victory over Peralta on 6 April 2003.

In the 2005–06 season and the first half of the following campaign, Toledo had his first and only experience as a professional, with second-tier club Elche. He scored in his debut in the competition, a 1–1 home draw against Eibar on 29 January of that year. In July 2007, following a loan at Levante B, he was released.

Toledo also played in his native France, and scored 6 goals in 30 matches for Villefranche and 18 goals in 53 games for Le Pontet.

Personal life
Toledo is of Spanish descent.

References

1983 births
Living people
Sportspeople from Avignon
French people of Spanish descent
French footballers
Nîmes Olympique players
Real Zaragoza B players
Elche CF players
Atlético Levante UD players
FC Cartagena footballers
Valencia CF Mestalla footballers
Real Jaén footballers
AD Ceuta footballers
CF Gandía players
FC Villefranche Beaujolais players
CD Guadalajara (Spain) footballers
US Pontet Grand Avignon 84 players
Segunda División players
Segunda División B players
Championnat National 2 players
Championnat National 3 players
Association football forwards
French expatriate footballers
French expatriate sportspeople in Spain
Expatriate footballers in Spain
Footballers from Provence-Alpes-Côte d'Azur